Scared to Death is a 1947 thriller Gothic film directed by Christy Cabanne and starring Bela Lugosi. The picture was filmed in Cinecolor. The film is historically important as the only color film in which Bela Lugosi has a starring role. Lionel Atwill was originally slated to appear in the film, but he was too ill to work, so George Zucco replaced him in the cast. Christy Cabanne completed the film in early 1946, but it wasn't screened until 1947.

Plot 
 

The film opens with the disclosure by morgue examiners that a beautiful woman has literally died of fright. The plot reveals how she reached the fatal stage of terror.

The woman is married to the son of a doctor, the proprietor of a private sanatorium, where she is under unwilling treatment.  Both the son and the doctor indicate they want the marriage dissolved. Arriving at the scene is a mysterious personage (Bela Lugosi) identified as the doctor's cousin who had been a stage magician in Europe.  He is accompanied by a threatening dwarf (Angelo Rossitto).

After it is apparent that the wife is terrified of the foreigners, it is disclosed that she is the former wife and stage partner of a Paris magician known as René, who was believed to have been shot by the Nazis. Attempts to draw a confession that she had betrayed her magician husband and had collaborated with the Nazis led to the use of a device employing a death mask of the supposedly dead patriot, which literally frightens her to death.

Although the young newspaperman hero and his sweetheart guess the answer to the story, they allow the diagnosis "scared to death" to stand.

Cast 
 Bela Lugosi as Prof. Leonide
 George Zucco as Dr. Joseph Van Ee
 Nat Pendleton as Bill Raymond
 Molly Lamont as Laura Van Ee / Laurette La Valle 
 Joyce Compton as Jane Cornell
 Gladys Blake as Lilybeth
 Roland Varno as Ward Van Ee
 Douglas Fowley as Terry Lee
 Stanley Andrews as Pathologist
 Angelo Rossitto as Indigo
 Lee Bennett as Rene
 Stanley Price as Autopsy Surgeon

Production 
The film was based on a one-act play which in turn was based on a 1933 murder case involving Dr. Alice Wynekoop.

The film was announced in March 1946 as Accent on Horror. The Autopsy was another title that was considered.

Reviews
Historian Gary Don Rhodes commented that although the film was in color, "nothing manages to stave off the inevitable boredom. Critics found the film confusing, dull....Very possibly this remains Lugosi's worst horror film."

References

External links 

 
 
 
 
 
 Review of film at Variety
 Paul Lewis, 2009: Review of Scared to Death at DVDCompare

1947 films
1947 horror films
American films based on plays
Films directed by Christy Cabanne
Cinecolor films
American horror thriller films
Lippert Pictures films
1940s English-language films
1940s American films